The 2012 Catalunya GP3 Series round was a GP3 Series motor race held at the Circuit de Catalunya in Montmeló, Spain on 12 and 13 May 2012 as the first round of the 2012 GP3 Series season. The race was used to support the 2012 Spanish Grand Prix.

First GP3 feature race of the season was won by Mitch Evans with Conor Daly winning the sprint race the next day.

The weekend also saw the GP3 Series introduce the points system used by Formula One since 2010 for the feature race, with points awarded to the top ten drivers and twenty-five points awarded to the race winner. The points for the sprint race were changed too, with the winner receiving fifteen points and the top eight drivers scoring points. The points for pole and the fastest lap were doubled too.

Classification

Qualifying

Notes:
 — Tio Ellinas and Vicky Piria were penalised by 10 grid positions after they ignored yellow flags in qualifying. Piria's grid position did not change because Kevin Ceccon did not set a time in qualifying.

Race 1

Race 2

Notes:
 — António Félix da Costa was given a 1-second time penalty added to his race result.

Standings after the round

Drivers' Championship standings

Teams' Championship standings

 Note: Only the top five positions are included for both sets of standings.

See also 
 2012 Spanish Grand Prix
 2012 Catalunya GP2 Series round

References

Catalunya
Catalunya